The 1987 Austrian Grand Prix was a Formula One motor race held at Österreichring on 16 August 1987. It was the tenth race of the 1987 Formula One World Championship. It was the twentieth Austrian Grand Prix, and the last to be held until .

The race needed to be restarted twice following crashes on the starting grid. It was eventually won by British driver Nigel Mansell, driving a Williams-Honda. Mansell took his third victory of the season by 56 seconds from Brazilian teammate Nelson Piquet, with Italian Teo Fabi third in a Benetton-Ford.

Race summary
The race was plagued with accidents. The first major incident came when Stefan Johansson hit a deer with his McLaren MP4/3 after it wandered onto the circuit during Friday practice. The McLaren left front suspension was broken in the impact causing it to spear off into the guardrail and all four corners of the car, as well as the carbon fibre monocoque were destroyed. Johansson was fortunate to escape with little more than a headache, though he was later flown by helicopter to a hospital in Klagenfurt for x-rays after complaining of headaches and neck pains. His crash caused McLaren to have to fly a spare car overnight from the team's base in Woking. Nelson Piquet's Williams-Honda had collided with the AGS of Pascal Fabre, ending with the Williams impacting in the wall.

The first race start ended quickly after the Zakspeed of Martin Brundle crashed, then the two Tyrrells of Jonathan Palmer and Philippe Streiff collided in the ensuing chaos with Piercarlo Ghinzani also crashing his Ligier. The second attempt to start was more serious. Mansell on the front row crawled away with clutch problems and the grid compacted behind him. The Österreichring's narrow front straight saw to the rest when Eddie Cheever (Arrows) and Riccardo Patrese (Brabham) collided and half the grid, including Johansson, Alex Caffi (Osella), Ivan Capelli (March), Pascal Fabre, Philippe Alliot (Larrousse-Lola), and both Zakspeeds of Brundle and Christian Danner were involved in the ensuing pile-up.

For the third start Streiff was missing. Tyrrell had run out of usable cars and Palmer got the use of the surviving DG016 as he had qualified higher (24th) than his teammate (25th). Several drivers were in repaired cars or in spare cars, including Ayrton Senna after a CV joint failed in his Lotus during the second start. The third start, over two hours late, continued to claim cars. Alain Prost (McLaren) had an electrical failure as the warm-up lap began. The team mechanics got the car going and Prost started from the pitlane along with Senna and the Ferrari of Michele Alboreto. The third attempt to start had no problems although Johansson soon pitted with a puncture then had a tyre fall off on his out lap after a chaotic pitstop. Johansson made it back to the pits and resumed.

Piquet led early from Thierry Boutsen in his Benetton and Mansell. Boutsen pitted with gear linking problems and Mansell leapt past Piquet while negotiating lapped cars. Fabi (Benetton) was a lap down in third ahead of Boutsen in a season best result for the team. Recovering from their difficulties, Senna, Prost and Johansson finished fifth, sixth and seventh. Ghinzani was eighth for Ligier ahead of Danner and René Arnoux in the second Ligier. Sixteen cars finished although Fabre had not completed enough laps to be classified and 14th placed Brundle would be disqualified for a bodywork infringement on the spare Zakspeed 871, pressed into service after the startline collisions.

Classification

Qualifying

Race 
Numbers in brackets refer to positions of naturally aspirated entrants competing for the Jim Clark Trophy.

Championship standings after the race

Drivers' Championship standings

Constructors' Championship standings

Jim Clark Trophy standings

Colin Chapman Trophy standings

 Note: Only the top five positions are included for all four sets of standings.

References

Austrian Grand Prix
Grand Prix
Austrian Grand Prix
August 1987 sports events in Europe